Brandon Guillory (June 28, 1983) is a former professional Canadian football defensive end. He was signed as an undrafted free agent by the Kansas City Chiefs in 2006. He played college football at UL Monroe. Former teammate of Wide-Receiver Drouzon Quillen. Also known as the "GreenEyeMonSTAR"

Guillory has also been a member of the Edmonton Eskimos and Hamilton Tiger-Cats.

External links
Just Sports Stats
Hamilton Tiger-Cats bio
Kansas City Chiefs bio

1983 births
Living people
Players of American football from New Orleans
Players of Canadian football from New Orleans
Canadian football defensive linemen
American football defensive linemen
American players of Canadian football
Kansas City Chiefs players
Edmonton Elks players
Hamilton Tiger-Cats players